The Mithrodiidae is a family of starfish in the order Valvatida.

Members of this family are big to huge tropical sea stars with 5 arms, rounded in cross-section.

List of genera and species 
 Genus Mithrodia Gray, 1840
 Mithrodia bradleyi Verrill, 1870
 Mithrodia clavigera (Lamarck, 1816)
 Mithrodia fisheri Holly, 1932
 Genus Thromidia Pope & Rowe, 1977
 Thromidia brycei Marsh, 2009
 Thromidia catalai Pope & Rowe, 1977
 Thromidia gigas (Mortensen, 1935)
 Thromidia seychellesensis Pope & Rowe, 1977

References

 
Echinoderm families